Tenpenny Joke were an Australian rock band, formed in 1997. They signed to Shock Records/Sing Sing Productions in 2004, and released their debut album, Ambush on all Sides, in 2005, which was produced by Matt Voigt (The Living End, Kiss, Aaliyah). It was then released internationally by Promoting the Bands.

History 

Tenpenny Joke were formed on Melbourne's Mornington Peninsula in 1997. They issued their debut studio album, Ambush on all Sides, in September 2005 via Shock Records. It was recorded at Sing Sing Studios, Richmond during two sessions: one in November 2004 and the other in April 2005. By the time the album appeared the line-up was Craig "Boz" Boswell on drums, Anthony Casey on vocals, Peter Coon on guitars, Tim Kill on bass guitar and Brian Rimmer on vocals and guitar. In January 2006 Rimmer explained their sound to Australian Music Onlines interviewer, "Melodic rock is probably the label that comes closest, but it has also been described as progressive and alternative." By May 2012 the group had disbanded, "the future of the band doesn't look too bright and according to their defunct website they are currently on hiatus."

Touring
The band toured regularly around Australia, sharing the stage with acts such as Dallas Crane, End Of Fashion, Mandy Kane, Cosmic Nomads and Kisschasy. 2006 saw the band touring New Zealand with Ruptus Jack sponsored by Jägermeister. Tenpenny Joke began 2007 performing at the Rip Curl Pro Surf Festival in Bells Beach, Torquay.

In March 2006 Tenpenny Joke travelled overseas for a three-week tour of New Zealand to strengthen their international fan base and promote their debut album. Sponsored by Jägermeister, the response was underwhelming. With interviews and radio appearances to promote the album and shows, the tour was unsuccessful in breaking into the New Zealand market.

Tenpenny Joke have completed multiple tours of Australia promoting their debut album 'Ambush On All Sides', performing shows throughout Queensland, Sydney and New South Wales, Victoria, Adelaide and Mount Hotham to name a few. The band also infrequently toured regional areas, covering some of Australia's major country centres. In early 2006 the band performed in Mildura to launch the first issue of Forty 2, the new Mildura youth/arts magazine featuring the band on the cover.

Radio
Tenpenny Joke have been featured on Australian radio, with their single She becoming one of Triple J presenter Rosie Beaton's picks for 2007. They also have been featured on the French webradio "Muzeeli".

Ambush On All Sides received minimal radio airplay across Australia featuring on stations such as:
 Triple J (where She became a 'hit pick' by presenter Rosie Beaton's picks for 2007)
 Triple R
 PBS
 Syn FM

Tenpenny Joke have also been featured regularly on 'Yellowbeat' radio in Tokyo (where Across The Ocean became a most-requested track) and have received airplay in the US, UK, Europe, New Zealand and parts of Asia. The album has also been featured on college radio in the US as well as on internet radio stations and podcasts worldwide.

Television
Tenpenny Joke's video She was played on ABC's Rage along with videos Even Harbour and Sense. They have performed live on SBS's music program Noise TV & Channel 31's music shows On The Couch, Asylum TV & The Loft.
Other Television, Film and Media include:
A Family - German film featuring Evil Things
Snow Job - Australian film featuring Evil Things & Sirens
Australian Surfing Life - Retail DVD (Australia) featuring Flood & Sirens as the soundtrack
I Surf: Issue 6 - Australian surfing magazine/DVD featuring Sense video
I Surf: Issue 3 - Australian surfing magazine/DVD featuring Flood & Sense as the soundtrack
Brazilian Surf - Retail DVD (Brazil) featuring She & Caroline as the soundtrack
Rage - Australia's longest running music video show has featured some of the bands videos.

Live Shows
Tenpenny Joke were a regular on the Melbourne live circuit. The band have also performed in Queensland, New South Wales, Victoria, South Australia, Sydney, Melbourne, Brisbane, Mount Hotham, Auckland, Wellington and Christchurch.

Recent major live performances include the Rip Curl Pro Surf Festival at Bells Beach fourteen years ago.

Press Reviews

 "Excellent music: vocals, instrumentation (especially the guitars), production ...all is superb. Recalls the glory days of Alice in Chains. You've just gotten yourself a new fan." Peter Greenway, Pro Music Reviewer, Broadjam USA
"The philosophy of Tenpenny Joke is deceptively simple - hit songs, and more of them." Damon Carrol, Triple R Radio
 "From the opening stereopanned hypnotic indian riffs, this album began to reel me in. Expertly executed performances from all. "She" - a great rock song sandwiched between the aforementioned 'indianisms' and a beautiful chamber orchestra finale! Then the straight-ahead riffing of "Sirens" gets serious. Comparisons to anyone do this band a disservice. "Sense", like "She" makes fine use of the stereo picture in its guitar and vocal work. Simple but highly effective. Great contemporary rock harmonies, just enough edge to the singer's vocals - which are inherently listenable. You get the feeling that this band's creative well runneth over. A truly great rock album, by anyone's standards." - Kevin Moore, Jamendo UK.

Chart position
Tenpenny Jokes debut album was briefly available at JB Hi Fi, it did not sell enough units to chart and is currently out of print.  It has, however, charted on various Internet charts as most-downloaded album, album of the week, highest-rated new release etc. For instance She was one of the highest-charting songs on now defunct independent music site Garageband.com, and overall the highest-ranked alternative rock song on the website.

Garageband.com Awards:
 Track of the Day on 1, Sep2005 in Alternative Rock
 Track of the Day on 16, Sep2005 in Rock
 Track Of The Week on 31, Jul2006 in Alternative Rock
 Track Of The Week on 28, Aug2006 in Rock
 No. 18 Best Guitars in Alternative Rock, all-time
 No. 19 Best Production in Alternative Rock, all-time
 Best Male Vocals in Alternative Rock, week of 16, Oct2006
 Best Guitars in Alternative Rock, week of 22, Aug2005
 Best Guitars in Alternative Rock, week of 29, Aug2005
 Best Guitars in Alternative Rock, week of 9, Oct2006
 Best Drums overall, week of 29, Aug2005
 Best Drums in Alternative Rock, week of 22, Aug2005
 Best Drums in Alternative Rock, week of 29, Aug2005
 Best Drums in Alternative Rock, week of 9, Oct2006
 Best Programming in Alternative Rock, week of 22, Aug2005
 Best Production in Alternative Rock, week of 22, Aug2005
 Best Production in Alternative Rock, week of 29, Aug2005
 Best Production in Alternative Rock, week of 16, Oct2006
 Best Lyrics in Alternative Rock, week of 9, Oct2006
 Best Melody in Alternative Rock, week of 9, Oct2006
 Best Melody in Alternative Rock, week of 16, Oct2006
 Best Beat in Alternative Rock, week of 22, Aug2005
 Best Beat in Alternative Rock, week of 9, Oct2006
 Most Original in Alternative Rock, week of 22, Aug2005
 Most Original in Alternative Rock, week of 9, Oct2006 Rocking Track overall, week of 22, Aug2005
 Most Original in Alternative Rock, week of 9, Oct2006
 Rocking Track overall, week of 22, Aug2005
 Rocking Track in Alternative Rock, week of 22, Aug2005
 Rocking Track in Alternative Rock, week of 12, Sep2005
 Grooviest Rhythm in Alternative Rock, week of 9, Oct2006

Discography

Albums

 Ambush on all Sides (5 September 2005): – Shock Records (SHK SS001)

EPs
 Even Harbour (2003)
 Tenpenny Joke (self-titled) (2000)

Videos
Tenpenny Jokes original videos have been removed from YouTube and replaced by generic videos bearing their band logo. However, on May 30, 2022, they brought them back.

 Black Satellite (2007)
 Don't Go (2007)
 Sirens (2006)
 She (2005)
 Sense (2004)
 Even Harbour (2003)
 Caroline (2008)

References

External links
 
 

Australian alternative rock groups